Uzoma is a unisex given name and surname of Igbo origin.

The name Uzoma means "beautiful way" or "good path (in life)."

Given name
John Uzoma Ekwugha Amaechi (born 1970), English basketball player and psychologist
Uzoma Asagwara (born 1984), Canadian politician and basketball player
Uzoma Azuka (born 1970), Nigerian handballer
Uzama Douglas (1998–2016), Nigerian footballer
Uzoma Dozie (born 1969), Nigerian banker
Uzoma Emenike, Nigerian politician and diplomat
Uzoma Nwachukwu (born 1990), American football player
Jude Uzoma Ohaeri, Nigerian professor and academic
Uzooma Okeke (born 1970) American football player
Uzoma Okwuchi Osimkpa, Nigerian actress

Surname
C. J. Uzomah (born 1993), American football player
Eke Uzoma (born 1989), Nigerian footballer
Felix Anudike-Uzomah (born 2002), American football player
Genny Uzoma, Nigerian actress
Ike Uzoma (born 1978), Nigerian footballer

See also
List of Igbo people